Tructémonde was a seventh-century catholic Bishop of Oloron which is in France.

Although the seventh century was a formative time for the French state, the historical records of the time are sparse and little is known about his origins, career or his episcopal work other than he took the diocesean throne in 661.

References 

Bishops of Oloron
7th-century Frankish bishops